Gavmishan (also Romanized as Gāvmīshān; also known as Gāmīshān) is a village in Behi Dehbokri Rural District, Simmineh District, Bukan County, West Azerbaijan Province, Iran. At the 2006 census, its population was 73, comprising 14 families.

References 

Populated places in Bukan County